The East Siberian taiga ecoregion, in the Taiga and boreal forests biome, is a very large biogeographic region in eastern Russia.

Setting
This vast ecoregion is located in the heart of Siberia, stretching over 20° of latitude and 50° of longitude (52° to 72° N, and 80° to 130° E). Winters are long and very cold, but dry, with little snowfall due to the effects of the Siberian anticyclone. Summers are short, but can be quite warm for the northerly location.

The topography of this ecoregion is varied, consisting of wide, flat plains and areas of karst topography. In contrast to the neighbouring West Siberian taiga, large bogs and wetlands are conspicuously absent. Some trees also shed their leaves annually, a characteristic of deciduous forests.

Flora
Vegetation consists mainly of vast, dense forests of Dahurian larch (Larix gmelinii), with Siberian larch (Larix sibirica) and hybrids between the Dahurian and Siberian larches (Larix x czekanowskii) occurring as one moves to the west. Cranberry (Vaccinium oxycoccus) and bilberry (Vaccinium myrtillus) bushes dominate the understory.

Throughout the ecoregion, smaller areas dominated by Siberian pine (Pinus sibirica), Scots pine (Pinus sylvestris), Siberian spruce (Picea obovata) and Siberian fir (Abies sibirica) can be found. Pine forests and deciduous forests composed of birch and poplar species become more common as one moves south, and at the headwaters of the Lena River and the Nizhnyaya Tunguska River, as well as in the Angara River basin, steppe and shrub-steppe communities can be found along with areas of forest-steppe.

Fauna

This region contains the highest number of brown bears (Ursus arctos collaris), Eurasian wolf (Canis lupus), moose (Alces alces) and wild reindeer (Rangifer tarandus) in Russia. Further south mammals in the East Siberian taiga include Siberian musk deer (Moschus moschiferus), Altai wapiti also known as Asian elk (Cervus canadensis sibiricus) and wild boar (Sus scrofa). Birds of this ecoregion include the golden eagle (Aquila chrysaetos), peregrine falcon (Falco peregrinus), osprey (Pandion haliaetus), hazel grouse (Tetrastes bonasia), Siberian grouse (Falcipennis falcipennis), black grouse (Lyrurus tetrix), western capercaillie (Tetrao urogallus), black-billed capercaillie (Tetrao parvirostris), willow ptarmigan (Lagopus lagopus), rock ptarmigan (Lagopus muta), black stork (Ciconia nigra), hooded crane (Grus monacha), carrion crow (Corvus corone), the Siberian blue and rufous-tailed robins (Luscinia cyane and L. sibilans, respectively), the thrush nightingale (Luscinia luscinia), Pallas's rosefinch (Carpodacus roseus), Pacific swift (Apus pacificus), common goldeneye (Bucephala clangula), smew (Mergellus albellus), king eider (Somateria spectabilis), spectacled eider (Somateria fischeri) and Baikal teal (Anas formosa).

Conservation Status, threats and protected areas

Although little of this ecoregion is protected, its conservation status is listed as "Relatively Stable/Intact". Protected areas in this ecoregion include:
 Stolby Nature Sanctuary
 Olyokma Nature Reserve
 Tunguska Nature Reserve
 Central Siberia Nature Reserve
All are "Zapovedniks", (that is, strict ecological reserves).  The main threats to this ecoregion's integrity are poaching and clear-cut logging in the southern and central portions of the region.

After the collapse of the Soviet Union, came a new threat. There is little forest in China, and Chinese entrepreneurs (due to the lack of woods, and fuelled by strong economic growth), began to show interest in obtaining the woods from RF. High levels of corruption and some other reasons allowed them to achieve their goal. A new law adopted was Federal law 473-FZ, which protects the rights of foreign companies in RF, and Chinese lumberjacks began to destroy all the trees on the leased land (and far beyond too). There have been numerous attempts of deforestation in the protected floodplain of the rivers. Because of the large environmental damage, their activities caused protests by local residents and the World Wide Fund for Nature. The actions of the Chinese companies pose a threat to the native population of Siberia and the Far East (Evenks, Udege et al.), depriving them of their habitat and traditional ways of life. Total deforestation by Chinese companies creates an additional threat to rare and endangered species such as the Siberian tiger, Amur leopard, East Siberian brown bear, among others.

See also

 Tunguska event
 Taiga

References

External links 

Taiga and boreal forests
Ecoregions of Asia
Ecoregions of Russia
 
Geography of Siberia
Natural history of Siberia
Palearctic ecoregions